Yaadhavam is a 1993 Indian Malayalam-language action film directed by Jomon and written by Ranjith, starring Suresh Gopi, Madhu, Narendra Prasad, and Khushbu. The film was an average grosser at the box office.

Plot

Chandrasenan, popularly known as "Senan" and his younger brother Vishnu run a parallel government in Kozhikode city. There, Anjana, a young and charming lady reporter from Mumbai is coming to find her father Vishwanatha Menon, the Central Industries Minister. He is an innocent soul, but his adopted son Devan had been involved in many illegal activities.

While Devan approach Senan for helping him to finish Anjana, it leads to a heated argument between Vishnu and Senan. Vishnu falls deeply in love with Anjana when knowing about her story. Mohan Thambi, an illegal businessman is planning to contest against Vishwanatha Menon in the coming by-election. Devan and Mohan Thamby bribe Chekkootty, the right-hand of Senan and Chekkootty, stabbing Senan by ambushing him from behind, killing him. Vishnu is now planning to avenge against Devan and Mohan Thamby, who were planning to kill Vishwanatha Menon.

Cast
Suresh Gopi as Vishnu
Madhu as Vishwanatha Menon, Central Industries Minister
Narendra Prasad as Senan (Chandrasenan)
Khushbu as Anjana
Ganesh Kumar as Devan, Menon's adopted son
Devan as Mohan Thampi
Maniyanpilla Raju as Palappuram
Kunjandi as Ramettan, Labour party leader
KR Vijaya as Prabhadevi
Bahadoor as Madhavettan
Rekha  as Jayanthi
Sathaar as Chekkutty
Janardhanan as Commissioner Saankaranarayanan
Subair as CI Jayapal 
Thalapathy Dinesh as SI Nagesh
Abu Salim
C. I. Paul as Chief Minister
Biyon as Senan's childhood
Beena Antony as SI Nagesh's wife
Sandhya as Cicily, Palappuram's wife
Divya as Manisha
Pavithran as Balan Vallikkavu, youth leader
Vijayan Peringode as Mayan

References

External links
 

1993 films
1990s Malayalam-language films